Mary, Lady Heath (17 November 1896 – 9 May 1939) was an Irish aviator and began life as Sophie Catherine Theresa Mary Peirce-Evans in Knockaderry, County Limerick, near the town of Newcastle West. She was one of the best known women in the world for a five-year period from the mid-1920s.

Early life
When the young Sophie Peirce-Evans was one year old, her father John Peirce-Evans, bludgeoned her mother Kate Theresa Dooling to death with a heavy stick. He was found guilty of murder and declared insane. His daughter was taken to the home of her grandfather in Newcastle West where she was brought up by two maiden aunts, who discouraged her passion for sports.

After schooldays in Rochelle School, Cork; Princess Garden Belfast and St Margaret's Hall on Mespil Road in Dublin, where she played hockey and tennis, Sophie enrolled in the Royal College of Science for Ireland on Merrion Street (now Government Buildings).

The college was designed to produce the educated farmers which the country then needed. Sophie, one of the few women in the college, duly took a top-class degree in science, specialising in agriculture. She also played with the college hockey team and contributed to a student magazine, copies of which are held in the National Library of Ireland. After getting her degree, she moved to Kenya with her first husband, William Elliot-Lynn. In 1925, she published a book of poetry called East African Nights.

She was a Soroptimist and a Founder Member of SI Greater London, which was chartered in 1923.

Careers

Athletics
Before becoming a pilot Lady Heath had already made her mark. During the First World War, she spent two years as a dispatch rider, based in England and later France, where she had her portrait painted by Sir John Lavery. By then, she had married the first of her three husbands and as Sophie Mary Eliott-Lynn, was one of the founders of the Women's Amateur Athletic Association after her move from her native Ireland to London in 1922, following a brief sojourn in Aberdeen. She was Britain's first women's javelin champion and set a disputed world record for the high jump. She was also a delegate to the International Olympic Committee in 1925, the same year that she took her first flying lessons. In 1923 she represented the United Kingdom at the 1923 Women's Olympiad in Monte Carlo, during the games she came third place at the high jump, javelin throw and the Women's pentathlon, later that year she participated in the first WAAA Championships. In 1924 she participated in the 1924 Women's Olympiad winning the silver medal in the long jump, in 1926 she again represented the United Kingdom at javelin at the 1926 Women's World Games in Gothenburg, coming fourth with a throw of 44.63 metres. In 1925, she published a coaching manual Athletics for women and girls, which advised on basic training. In 1928, Lady Heath represented England as a judge in the 1928 Summer Olympics, the first Olympics in which women's athletics were included.

Aviation career

The following year, Lady Heath became the first woman to hold a commercial flying licence in Britain and along the way, set records for altitude in a small plane and later a Shorts seaplane, was the first woman to parachute from an aeroplane (landing in the middle of a football match). After her great flight from the Cape, she took a mechanic's qualification in the US, the first woman to do so.

In an era when the world had gone aviation-mad due to the exploits of Charles Lindbergh and Amelia Earhart, Lady Heath was more than able to hold her own. "Britain's Lady Lindy," as she was known in the United States, made front-page news as the first pilot, male or female, to fly a small open-cockpit aircraft from Cape Town to London (Croydon Aerodrome). She had thought it would take her three weeks; as it turned out, it took her three months, from January to May 1928.

A scale model of the plane used by Lady Heath is on display at The Little Museum of Dublin. She wrote about the experience later in a book Woman and Flying, that she co-wrote with Stella Wolfe Murray. In July 1928 she spent a few weeks volunteering as a co-pilot with a civil airline, KLM. She was hoping to be appointed to the newly created Batavia route, which would have made her the first woman pilot with a commercial airline. The world was not ready for female pilots and her hope was not fulfilled.

Just when her fame was at its height, with her life a constant whirl of lectures, races and long-distance flights, Lady Heath (she married Sir James Heath in October 1927) was badly injured in a crash just before the National Air Races in Cleveland, Ohio in 1929. Before her accident Lady Heath applied for American citizenship, intending to remain in the USA where she had made a good living on the lecture circuit and as an agent for Cirrus engines. Lady Heath was never the same after her accident.

After divorce in Reno, Nevada, from Heath in 1930, she returned to Ireland with her third husband G.A.R. Williams, a horseman and pilot of Caribbean origin, and became involved in private aviation, briefly running her own company at Kildonan, near Dublin in the mid-1930s, and helping produce the generation of pilots that would help establish the national airline Aer Lingus.

Family life

Marriages
Lady Heath's first marriage was to Major William Eliot Lynn after which she was well known as Mrs Eliot Lynn. She divorced her husband, alleging cruelty and after he died in London in early 1927, married Sir James Heath on 11 October 1927 at Christ Church in Mayfair, London.  In January 1930 she filed for a divorce from Heath in Reno, Nevada, United States and was awarded a decree nisi in May of the same year.

On 12 November 1931, she married G.A.R. Williams in Lexington, Kentucky, United States.

Death
On 9 May 1939, aged 42, she died in St Leonard's Hospital, Shoreditch, London following a fall inside a double-decker tram. At the inquest the conductor gave evidence that she was sitting on the top deck and she seemed "very vague"; another passenger commented to the conductor that "I think the lady is asleep", before she fell down the stairs and hit her head on the driver's controller box.  In the previous years, with alcoholism now a serious problem, she had left Ireland and her husband for England and had made a number of appearances in court on charges relating to drunkenness.

A pathologist said he found no evidence of alcohol but detailed evidence of an old blood clot which may have caused the fall; the jury returned a verdict of accidental death.  On 15 May 1939, according to newspaper reports,  her ashes were scattered over Surrey from an aircraft flown by her estranged husband from Croydon Airport  although legend has it that her ashes were returned to Ireland where they were scattered over her native Newcastle West.

In popular culture
In 2013, aviator Tracey Curtis-Taylor retraced Lady Heath's 1928 South Africa to England flight in a biplane. The flight was the subject of a BBC documentary, which included details and photographs of Lady Heath's original flight.

See also
 Iona National Airways
 List of people on stamps of Ireland

References

Notes

Bibliography

 Heath, S.M.P.E. and Stella Wolfe Murray. Woman and Flying. London: J. Long, 1929.
 Naughton, Lindie. Lady Icarus: The Life of Irish Aviator Lady Mary Heath London: Ashfield Press, 2004. .
 Pelletier, Alain. High-Flying Women: a World History of Female Pilots. Sparkford, UK: Haynes, 2012. .

External links
 Pilot who made the history books had strong Kerry links — The Kingdom newspaper book review, 2 December 2004.
 Flights & Flyers, Time magazine article, 16 March 1931
  Lady Icarus — weblog of the author of a biography of Heath.
 Lady Heath: Ireland’s International Aviatrix The Historical Aviation Society of Ireland.

1896 births
1939 deaths
People from County Limerick
20th-century travel writers
Irish travel writers
Irish women non-fiction writers
Irish female javelin throwers
Irish female high jumpers
Irish women aviators
Wives of baronets
Women's World Games medalists